In the United Kingdom, access by the general public to firearms is subject to some of the strictest control measures in the world. However, fulfilment of the criteria and requirements as laid out by the laws results in the vast majority of firearm licence applications being approved.  Laws differ slightly in Northern Ireland due to Northern Ireland having its own firearms legislation. Concerns have been raised over the availability of illegal firearms.

Members of the public may own sporting rifles and shotguns, subject to licensing. However, handguns have been banned in Great Britain since the Dunblane school massacre in 1996. Section 5 handguns are permitted with "good reason".  One such good reason is Humane Animal Dispatch (HAD), for example a road traffic accident (RTA) with a deer.  In order to stop suffering to a deer after an RTA, the deer needs to be humanely dispatched.  Large calibre rifle ammunition often ricochets, therefore a hand gun is a suitable choice due to lower velocities and therefore the projectile remaining within the carcass.  Police forces often add licence restrictions such as one or two round capacity only under HAD. Handguns are permitted in Northern Ireland, Channel Islands and the Isle of Man which have their own legislation. 

Police in Great Britain are not routinely armed. Fatal shootings of police are extremely rare; there were three fatal police shootings in England and Wales in the eleven-year period from 2000 to 2011. Specially trained armed response units are available to deal with firearms incidents, and as of 31 March 2017 there were 6,278 armed officers serving in territorial police forces in England and Wales. There have only been six fatal mass shootings carried out by a civilian in the entire history of Great Britain, one of which took place in Hungerford on 19 August 1987, one taking place in Monkseaton on 30 April 1989, as well as the Dunblane massacre, the Cumbria shootings in June 2010, a shooting in Plymouth in August 2021, and the Skye and Wester Ross attacks in August 2022.

Summary

Fully automatic and submachine-guns are "prohibited weapons" and require explicit permission from central government to own. Generally, such permits are not made available to private citizens. There are also limited exceptions permitting pistols both to preserve firearms of historic or technical interest (classed as section 7 firearms) and to enable use by elite sports teams. 
Semi-automatic shotguns are restricted to a magazine capacity of no more than two shots and are held under Section 2 of the Firearms  Act, although a 'multi-shot' shotgun can be owned under section 1 (restricted firearms and ammunition) of the Firearms Act. Where the term 'multi-shot' is used, this refers to either a semi-automatic or pump-action shotgun with no restriction on magazine capacity. All other rifles and their ammunition are permitted with no limits as to magazine size, for permitted purposes, to include: target shooting, hunting, and historic and muzzle-loading weapons, as well as long-barrelled breech-loading pistols with a specific overall length, but not for self-defence since 1968; however if a home-owner is threatened they may be used in self-defence, so long as the force is reasonable. Shotgun possession and use is also controlled, and even low-power air rifles and pistols, while permitted, are controlled to some extent. Shotguns with a capacity of three rounds or less (up to guns with a magazine holding no more than two rounds, in addition to one in the chamber) are subject to less stringent licensing requirements than other firearms and require a shotgun certificate; shotguns with higher capacity require a Firearm Certificate.

Possession of live ammunition without an appropriate licence, or failure to store ammunition securely can lead to severe penalties. Ammunition for firearms may only be purchased and possessed by the holder of a Firearm Certificate relating to firearm capable of shooting that specific ammunition. Shotgun cartridges can legally be possessed by anybody over the age of 15 and no licence is required to possess such ammunition so long as the cartridges contain 5 or more shots. However, a shotgun certificate must still be shown at time of purchase.

While Scotland has had its own parliament (Holyrood) since the Scotland Act 1998, power to legislate on firearms was reserved to Westminster, which led to tensions between the British and Scottish parliaments, with the Scottish government wanting to enact stricter laws.

In Northern Ireland, firearms control laws are primarily regulated by the Firearms (Northern Ireland) Order 2004, which is slightly different from the law in Great Britain.

Legal classification

Rifles
Single-shot, bolt-action, Martini-action, lever-action (also called under-lever action) and revolver rifles and carbines are permitted, with certificate, in any calibre. Self-loading (also known as semi-automatic) or pump-action rifles are only permitted in .22 rimfire calibre.

Pistols
The 1997 law did not ban pistols as such and was drafted in terms of small firearms.
Only muzzle-loading pistols—including muzzle-loading revolvers—are permitted; in practice all such firearms use black powder—a Class 1 explosive—as the propellant. Small quantities of muzzle-loading pistols and revolvers in various calibres, which comply with the regulations, are manufactured. All other pistols are mostly prohibited in Great Britain, with some exceptions such as pistols used for the humane dispatch of injured animals (such as deer) and some historical firearms.

This law created a new market for "Long-barrelled revolvers" and "long-barrelled pistols", firearms with a permanently attached extension to the grip, making them long enough to fit under the legal definition of a rifle. Long-barrelled pistols in single-shot, or long-barrelled revolvers, both of any calibre, or semi-automatic in .22 rimfire, are all permitted with FAC.

Specific models of blank-firing starting pistol that are "readily convertible" to fire live ammunition may also be either banned or require a FAC. The Bruni Olympic .380 BBM blank-firing revolver was banned in 2010 on evidence that it was being illegally converted.

Shotguns
Single-, double-, or triple-barrelled shotguns, or those with a lever-action, pump-action, or semi-automatic action and fixed magazine capacity of no more than 2 cartridges are permitted on a Shotgun Certificate as long as they meet the criteria of having a minimum barrel length of 24", overall length of 40", and a non-detachable magazine (if present).

There's no limit on the number of guns or amount of ammunition that a SGC (shotgun certificate) holder can acquire or possess at one time, although each shotgun must be recorded on the certificates.

Cartridges obtained using a shotgun certificate must have at least 5 projectiles each with a maximum size of 0.36".
Other types of shotgun ammunition such as solid slugs can only be bought following the grant of an FAC (Firearm Certificate).

Shotguns with a detachable magazine or larger fixed magazine are considered firearms and require a Section 1 Firearm Certificate (24" rule and 40" fixed overall length) or break action shotguns with a minimum 12" barrel and overall 24" fixed length.

Airguns

Airguns are firearms like any other according to the definition given in the Firearms Act 1968 at section 57(1). However, with the exception of Scotland where a certificate is now required, they are exempt from the requirement that a Firearm Certificate or Shotgun Certificate need be obtained to possess or acquire them provided that they meet certain limits as to their power.

Air pistols with a muzzle energy not exceeding  and other airguns with muzzle energy not exceeding  do not require a certificate and may be acquired, purchased and possessed by anyone over the age of 18 and who is not a prohibited person as specified in section 21 of the Act which relates to persons previously convicted of a crime.

The UK Violent Crime Reduction Act 2006 controls online or mail-order sales of airguns by way of trade or business; transactions must be finalised face-to-face although the contract of sale may take place at a distance. The airgun may be sent by the seller to a Registered Firearms Dealer (who will act as the seller's agent in the sale) from whom the gun may be collected by the purchaser.

The same Act introduced the requirement that a person selling airguns or ammunition for airguns by way of trade or business be a Registered Firearms Dealer. It is not an offence for a private individual to sell an airgun to another person as long as both parties are not legally barred from possessing airguns and the transaction does not constitute a business activity.

It became a crime to fire an air weapon beyond the boundary of any premises without the occupier's permission, and increased the lower age limit for buying or possessing an air weapon to 18 years.

From 10 February 2011 the Crime & Security Act 2010 (S.46) made it an offence "for a person in possession of an air weapon to fail to take reasonable precautions to prevent any person under the age of eighteen from having the weapon with him".

Any person who is in a building or is on land as a trespasser whilst having a firearm with them commits the offence of trespassing with a firearm. It is immaterial whether or not they have any ammunition with them at the time or whether they actually intend to use it at the place in which they were trespassing.

Ammunition

Explosive, incendiary, noxious (biological, chemical) and armour-piercing ammunition types are "prohibited" for civilians. The Firearms (Amendment) Act 1997 (Section 9) generally prohibited expanding ammunition, but this conflicted with the Deer Act 1991 (which mandated its use for deer stalking). An exemption permitted the acquisition and possession of expanding ammunition on Firearm Certificates held for game shooting or deer-stalking but not target shooting. Section 219 of the Policing and Crime Act 2017 modified the 1997 Act to only apply to Pistol ammunition. The distinction is no longer made for rifles and expanding ammunition may be used for target shooting. The quantity of ammunition a Certificate Holder may possess is determined by Certificate conditions on a per-calibre basis.

Shotgun Cartridges are not restricted by certificate conditions and a Shotgun Certificate holder may acquire and possess as many as they like. Due to their bulky nature, normal shotgun cartridges are not subject to the same secure storage requirements as Section 1 ammunition. Solid slugs or cartridges containing fewer than 5 projectiles which are considered Section 1 and must be held on a Firearm Certificate.

Prohibited firearms

The following are generally prohibited:

 Fully automatic or burst-fire weapons, which may include some air guns.
 Semi-automatic or pump-action rifles that fire centre-fire ammunition (e.g. Ruger Mini-14, L1A1)
 Manually Actuated Release System Rifles (M.A.R.S) and Lever Release Rifles (not to be confused with Lever Action)
 Cartridge-ammunition handguns, regardless of calibre
 Firearms disguised as another item (e.g. walking sticks, mobile telephones, etc.)
 Rockets and mortars.
 Air guns chambered for self-contained gas cartridges. (Existing owners prior to 20 January 2004 were allowed ownership subject to obtaining a firearm certificate) 
 Any weapon of whatever description designed or adapted for the discharge of any noxious liquid, gas or other substance. This would generally include stun guns, or electric shock devices, CS gas (tear gas), OC spray (pepper spray), etc. Cattle prods would not generally be included, but it would depend on the type.

Firearms that previously fell into a prohibited category cannot be made legal if converted into an otherwise permitted form.

Licensing of firearms

With a few specialised exceptions, all firearms in the United Kingdom must be licensed on either a 5-year firearm certificate (FAC) or a shotgun certificate (SGC) issued by the police for the area in which they normally reside. Each certificate can list multiple firearms.

Shotguns thus defined are subject to a less rigorous certification process than for the full FAC; an applicant is not required by law to make a good case for being granted a certificate, but the police may withhold a certificate if they consider that the applicant does not have satisfactory security in place, or granting it would constitute a danger to public safety or to the peace. A certificate holder may possess as many shotguns as can be securely stored.

When applying for a firearm certificate, justification must be provided to the police for each firearm, and they are individually listed on the certificate by type, calibre, and serial number. A shotgun certificate similarly lists type, calibre and serial number, but permits possession of as many shotguns as can be safely accommodated. To gain permission for a new firearm, a "variation" must be sought, for a fee, unless the variation is made at the time of renewal, or unless it constitutes a one-for-one replacement of an existing firearm that will be disposed of. The certificate also sets out, by calibre, the maximum quantities of ammunition someone may possess at any one time, and is used to record ammunition purchases (except where ammunition is bought to use immediately on a range under s11 or s15 of the Firearms Act).

To obtain a firearm certificate, the police must be satisfied that a person has "good reason" to own each firearm, and that they can be trusted with it "without danger to the public safety or to the peace". Under Home Office guidelines, Firearm Certificates are only issued if a person has legitimate sporting, collecting, or work-related reasons for ownership. Since 1968, self-defence has not been considered a valid reason to own a firearm. The current licensing procedure involves: positive verification of identity, two referees of verifiable good character who have known the applicant for at least two years (and who may themselves be interviewed and/or investigated as part of the certification), approval of the application by the applicant's own family doctor, an inspection of the premises and cabinet where firearms will be kept and a face-to-face interview by a Firearms Enquiry Officer (FEO) also known as a Firearms Liaison Officer (FLO).  Only when all these stages have been satisfactorily completed will a licence be issued, which must be renewed every 5 years.

Any person who has been sentenced to between three months and three years in prison is automatically prohibited from possessing firearms (including airguns) and ammunition for five years from release. A person who has been sentenced to more than three years is prohibited for life. Application may be made to a court to reverse these prohibitions and this is likely to be successful in relation to convictions for crimes which do not relate to a person's fitness to possess firearms. Similarly, persons applying for licences with recent, serious mental health issues will also be refused a certificate.

Any person holding a Firearm or Shotgun Certificate must comply with strict storage conditions by storing their firearms/shotguns in a safe bolted to the floor or wall that complies to the standard BS 7558:1992. These storage arrangements are checked by the police before a licence is first granted, and on every renewal of the licence.

In the case of a firearm certificate the issuing police force may impose additional conditions over and above the statutory ones. However any condition appended to a certificate must be reasonable and must not be of such a restrictive nature as would amount to a constructive refusal to grant the certificate by making use so unlikely as to be practically impossible. Failure to comply with any of these conditions can result in criminal prosecution resulting in a prison sentence of up to six months. Revocation of the certificate is also possible, depending upon the nature of the breach.

A visitors permit is available for possession of firearms without certificate by visitors to the UK.

The penalty for possession of any type of firearm without a certificate is a maximum of 14 years in prison and an unlimited fine. The penalty for section 5 categories of firearm is subject to a mandatory minimum of five years. (Although the sentencing judge has discretion to depart from the minimum sentence if there are "exceptional circumstances").

The Violent Crime Reduction Act 2006 increased restrictions on the use, possession, sale and manufacture of both airguns and imitation firearms.

Pistols used for competitive target shooting 
Pistol shooting for sporting purposes has been effectively banned since 1997, although a temporary exemption was made for competitors to bring Section 5 firearms into the UK for the 2002 Commonwealth Games. This exemption only applied to the Games period and Home Nation pistol shooters had to train abroad prior to the Games. Ahead of the 2012 Olympic Games, Tessa Jowell (Minister for the Olympics) and the Home Secretary agreed to use Home Office powers to issue a small number of Section 5 Permits to elite pistol shooters nominated by British Shooting. With Glasgow winning the right to host the 2014 Commonwealth Games, this arrangement was continued after the 2012 Olympics, with a small number of UK ranges licensed for Section 5 shooting.

A few models of single-shot .22 calibre free pistol, as used in the 50 m Olympic 'Free Pistol' match, have been produced to meet the "long-barrelled pistol" conditions. Some free pistols have removable stabiliser bars extending backwards to improve stability; the UK-legal models have been made with non-removable stabilisers to extend the dimensions, instead of contrived and non-functional grip extensions. Examples are the single-shot Pardini K22 Longarm and the Westlake Britarms Long Pistol, a permitted .22 LR five-shot semi-automatic pistol.

Northern Ireland
More than 100,000 people in Northern Ireland (approximately 5.7% of the population) own firearms, having 380,000 among them. Gun control laws in Northern Ireland are less restrictive in some areas than gun laws in Great Britain due to the Good Friday Agreement, allowing Northern Ireland to govern itself and pass less restrictive laws. Gun laws in Northern Ireland are primarily affected by the Firearms (Northern Ireland) Order 2004. Any firearm that has a muzzle energy exceeding 1 joule must be listed on a firearms certificate. Northern Ireland has one firearms certificate and all firearms are listed on that certificate irrespective of type.

All firearms owners in Northern Ireland are required to apply for a firearm certificate to possess firearms.  Permits are issued to anyone who has good reason to possess firearms, such as target shooting and hunting.  All firearms certificate holders are required to demonstrate they can be entrusted with a firearm. It is recommended that firearms dealers selling firearms are to instruct new buyers, and those changing/acquiring another firearm, about the safety procedures for that firearm. Firearm certificate holders in Northern Ireland may transport their firearms (except handguns) to Great Britain and possess those firearms while in Great Britain due to reciprocal firearms certificate licensing arrangements.

Firearms certificate holders are limited to the number of rounds of each calibre of ammunition listed on their certificate to 1000 per listed calibre. This is a standard allowance given to every certificate holder. If a certificate holder requires a larger allowance, they must request that increase from PSNI Firearms Branch.

Semi-automatic rifles are permitted when chambered in .22 rimfire. Handguns, shotguns and air rifles are permitted in various calibres. There is currently no limit on magazine capacity for rifles or handguns. Shotguns are limited to a magazine capacity of 2 cartridges for field use. The shotgun capacity can be increased, upon application to the PSNI firearms branch, for target shooting use.

Magazines are considered a component part in Northern Ireland and a firearms certificate holder may only possess magazines for firearms listed on their certificate. As of 2021, all magazines are required to be listed on firearms certificates. This measure is PSNI Firearms Branch policy in line with the recent EU weapons directive. PSNI Firearms Branch are to clarify exactly how this will take place.

A firearm certificate for a personal protection weapon will only be authorised where the Police Service of Northern Ireland deems there is a "verifiable specific risk" to the life of an individual and that the possession of a firearm is a reasonable, proportionate and necessary measure to protect their life. Permits for personal protection also allow the holder to carry their firearms concealed. Northern Ireland is the only part of the United Kingdom where personal protection is accepted as a legitimate reason to obtain and own a firearm.

Scotland
Firearms laws in Scotland differ in some details from those in England and Wales, such as a license being required to own most air guns. However, in terms of licensing they are, currently, identical to England and Wales. A firearms certificate is required to purchase firearms, and a separate shotgun certificate is required for shotguns. The guiding laws for firearms in Scotland are the Firearms (Scotland) Rules 1989 and the Firearms Act (1968). All handguns, semi-automatic and pump-action non-rim-fire rifles are prohibited. A few pistols are licensed on a Firearm Certificate for exactly the same reasons as England and Wales. There are only 566 licensed handgun owners in Scotland.

Air weapon licensing

In 2006, Glasgow politician Tommy Sheridan of the political party Solidarity launched a consultation to restrict possession of air guns, highlighting recent cases including the death of toddler Andrew Morton but the Scottish Parliament did not have the power to ban airguns at the time so any measures would have needed to be formally approved by Westminster. Around this time, the media gave some exposure to growing public desire to have air guns banned or regulated, particularly from the parents of a child that died after being struck in the head by a pellet in Easterhouse, a suburb of east Glasgow. The child was said to have had a skull only two millimetres thick at the point of impact.

MSPs such as Kenny MacAskill have claimed Scotland has a problem with air gun violence. However official figures show that out of the estimated 500,000 airguns in Scotland there were only 195 offences a ratio of less than 0.04%. Not all of these offences have been linked to violence with many being minor.

The Commission on Scottish Devolution when implemented gave the Scottish Parliament powers to regulate air guns. On 14 December 2012, a consultation was launched to investigate proposals for licensing air weapons in Scotland. The Scottish Cabinet Secretary for Justice foreword in the consultation paper (titled Proposals for Licensing Air Weapons in Scotland) stated that the Scottish government "[does] not intend to ban air weapons outright, but [does] not think that it is appropriate in our modern Scotland that there can be up to half a million unregistered, uncontrolled and often forgotten firearms (however, air weapons are not considered 'firearms' under the law ) in circulation". It stated an aim to "ensure that only those people with a legitimate reason for owning and using an airgun should have access to them in the future, and that they are properly licensed and accounted for". In 2011/12 there were 195 offences involving air weapons in Scotland, compared to 3,554 in England and Wales. The consultation closed in March 2013 with 1,101 responses, 87% of which were opposed to the principle of licensing air weapons.

There are some exceptions for current FAC and SGC holders in that they may hold an air rifle on their current certificate and apply to add it/them when next renewing their FAC or SGC.

History of firearms legislation in the United Kingdom
Many laws and amendments governing possession and use of firearms have been enacted over the years; see  for a more complete list.

Following the assassination of William the Silent in 1584 with a concealed wheellock pistol, Queen Elizabeth I, fearing assassination by Roman Catholics, banned possession of wheellock pistols in England near a royal palace in 1594.

There were growing concerns in the 16th century over the use of guns and crossbows. Four acts were imposed to restrict their use in England and Wales.

The 1662 Act for ordering the Forces in the several Counties of the Kingdom enabled and authorized by warrant, local government personnel, to search for and seize all arms in the custody or possession of any person of persons whom the government judged dangerous to the peace of the kingdom.  It prohibited the search of rural houses during the night hours. It made it lawful in case of resistance to enter by force.  Furthermore, it allowed for the restoration of seized arms.

The Bill of Rights restated the ancient rights of the people to bear arms by reinstating the right of Protestants to have arms after they had been  disarmed by James II. It follows closely the Declaration of Rights made in Parliament in February 1689. The Bill of Rights text declares that "the Subjects which are Protestants may have Arms for their Defence suitable to their Conditions and as allowed by Law".

Whereas the late King James the Second, by the Assistance of divers evil Counsellors, Judges, and Ministers, employed by Him, did endeavour to subvert and extirpate the Protestant Religion, and the Laws and Liberties of this Kingdom ... (b)y assuming and exercising a Power of dispensing with and suspending of Laws, and the Execution of Laws, without Consent of Parliament ... (b)y causing several good Subjects, being Protestants, to be disarmed, at the same Time when Papists were both armed and employed contrary to Law ... (a)ll which are utterly and directly contrary to the known Laws and Statutes and Freedom of this Realm ... the said Lords Spiritual and Temporal and Commons, pursuant to their respective Letters and Elections, being now assembled in a full and free Representative of this Nation, taking into their most serious Consideration the best Means for attaining the Ends aforesaid, do in the First Place (as their Ancestors in like Case have usually done), for the vindicating and asserting their ancient Rights and Liberties, Declare, ... That the Subjects which are Protestants may have Arms for their Defence, suitable to their Condition, and as allowed by Law.

The rights of English subjects and, after 1707, British subjects, to possess arms was recognised under English common law. Sir William Blackstone's Commentaries on the Laws of England, were highly influential and were used as a reference and text book for English Common Law. In his Commentaries, Blackstone described the right to arms.

The fifth and last auxiliary right of the subject, that I shall at present mention, is that of having arms for their defence, suitable to their condition and degree, and such as are allowed by law. Which is also declared by the same statute I W. & M. st.2. c.2. and is indeed a public allowance, under due restrictions, of the natural right of resistance and self-preservation, when the sanctions of society and laws are found insufficient to restrain the violence of oppression.

Formerly, this same British common law applied to the UK and Australia, and until 1783 to the colonies in North America that became the United States. The right to keep and bear arms had originated in England during the reign of Henry II with the 1181 Assize of Arms, and developed as part of common law.

After the Jacobite rebellions of 1715 and 1745, harsh laws providing, amongst other things, for disarming the Highlands of Scotland, were enacted by the Parliament of Great Britain: the Disarming Acts of 1716 and 1725, and the Act of Proscription 1746.

The first British firearm controls were introduced as part of the Vagrancy Act 1824, which was set up in a reaction against the large number of people roaming the country with weapons brought back from the Napoleonic wars. It allowed the police to arrest "any person with any gun, pistol, hanger [a light sword], cutlass, bludgeon or other offensive weapon ... with intent to commit a felonious act". It was followed by the Night Poaching Acts 1828 and 1844, the Game Act 1831, and the Poaching Prevention Act 1862, which made it an offence to shoot game illegally by using a firearm.

The Gun Licence Act 1870 was created to raise revenue. It required a person to obtain a licence to carry a gun outside his own property for any reason. A licence was not required to buy a gun. The licences cost 10 shillings (equivalent to about £31 in 2005), lasted one year and could be bought over the counter at Post Offices.

Pistols Act 1903
The Pistols Act 1903 was the first to place restrictions on the sale of firearms. Titled "An Act to regulate the sale and use of Pistols or other Firearms", it was short, with just nine sections, and applied solely to pistols. It defined a pistol as a firearm whose barrel did not exceed  in length and made it illegal to sell or rent a pistol to anyone who could not produce a current gun licence or game licence, unless they were exempt from the Gun Licence Act, could prove that they planned to use the pistol on their own property, or had a statement signed by a police officer of inspector rank or above or a Justice of the Peace to the effect that they were about to go abroad for six months or more. The Act was more or less ineffective, as anyone wishing to buy a pistol commercially merely had to purchase a licence on demand over the counter from a Post Office before doing so. In addition, it did not regulate private sales of such firearms.

The legislators laid some emphasis on the dangers of pistols in the hands of children and drunkards and made specific provisions regarding sales to these two groups: persons under 18 could be fined 40 shillings if they bought, hired, or carried a pistol, while anyone who sold a pistol to such a person could be fined £5. Anyone who sold a pistol to someone who was "intoxicated or of unsound mind" was liable to a fine of £25 or 3 months' imprisonment with hard labour. However, it was not an offence under the Act to give or lend a pistol to anyone belonging to the two groups.

Firearms Act 1920
The Firearms Act 1920 was partly spurred by fears of a possible surge in crime from the large number of firearms available following World War I and also fears of working-class unrest in this period. "An Act to amend the law relating to firearms and other weapons and ammunition", its main stated aim was to enable the government to control the overseas arms trade and so fulfill its commitment to the 1919 Paris Arms Convention. The ongoing Anglo-Irish War may also have been a factor, as Britain and Ireland were at that time still in union with each other, and the Act also applied to Ireland. It required anyone wanting to purchase or possess a firearm or ammunition to obtain a firearm certificate. The certificate, which lasted for three years, specified not only the firearm but also the amount of ammunition the holder could buy or possess. Local chief constables decided who could obtain a certificate and had the power to exclude anyone of "intemperate habits" or "unsound mind", or anyone considered "for any reason unfitted to be trusted with firearms". Applicants for certificates also had to convince the police that they had a good reason for needing a certificate. The law did not affect smooth-bore guns, which were available for purchase without any form of paperwork. The penalty for violating the Act was a fine of up to £50 or "imprisonment with or without hard labour for a term not exceeding three months", or both.

The right of individuals to bear arms had previously been, in the words of the 1689 Bill of Rights, "as allowed by law". The 1920 Act made this right conditional upon the Home Secretary and the police. A series of classified Home Office directives defined for the benefit of chief constables what constituted good reason to grant a certificate. They originally included self-defence.

As the 1920 Act did not prevent criminals from obtaining firearms illegally, in 1933 the Firearms and Imitation Firearms (Criminal Use) Bill was submitted to Parliament. It increased the punishment for the use of a gun in the commission of a crime and made it an offence punishable by up to 14 years' imprisonment for anyone to "attempt to make use" of any firearm or imitation firearm to resist arrest. Possession of a real or imitation firearm was also made an offence unless the possessor could show he had it for "a lawful object".

Firearms Act 1937
The Firearms Act 1937 incorporated various modifications to the 1920 Act based on the recommendations of a 1934 committee chaired by Sir Archibald Bodkin.

The same year, the Home Secretary ruled that self-defence was no longer a suitable reason for applying for a firearm certificate and directed police to refuse such applications on the grounds that "firearms cannot be regarded as a suitable means of protection and may be a source of danger".

Firearms Act 1968
The Firearms Act 1968 brought together all existing firearms legislation in a single statute. Disregarding minor changes, it formed the legal basis for British firearms control policy until the Firearms (Amendment) Act 1988 was put through Parliament in the aftermath of the 1987 Hungerford massacre. For the first time, it introduced controls for long-barrelled shotguns, in the form of Shotgun Certificates that, like Firearm Certificates, were issued by an area's chief constable in England, Scotland, and Wales. While applicants for Firearms Certificates had to show a good reason for possessing the firearm or ammunition, it did not apply to Shotgun Certificates. Firearms and ammunition had to be kept locked up in a secure place approved by the local police firearms officer.

The Act also prohibited the possession of firearms or ammunition by criminals who had been sentenced to imprisonment; those sentenced to three months to three years imprisonment were banned from possessing firearms or ammunition for five years, while those sentenced to longer terms were banned for life. However, an application could be made to have the prohibition removed.

The Act was accompanied by an amnesty; many older weapons were handed in to the police. It has remained a feature of British policing that from time to time a brief firearms amnesty is declared.

The Firearms (Amendment) Act 1988

In the aftermath of the Hungerford massacre, Parliament passed the Firearms (Amendment) Act 1988. This confined semi-automatic and pump-action centre-fire rifles, military weapons firing explosive ammunition, short shotguns that had magazines, and elevated both pump-action and self-loading rifles to the Prohibited category. Registration and secure storage of shotguns held on Shotgun Certificates became required, and shotguns with more than a 2+1 capacity came to need a Firearm Certificate. The law also introduced new restrictions on shotguns. Rifles in .22 rimfire and semi-automatic pistols were unaffected.

1997 Firearms (Amendment) Acts

Following the Dunblane massacre, the government passed the Firearms (Amendment) Act 1997 and the Firearms (Amendment) (No. 2) Act 1997, defining "short firearms" as Section 5 Prohibited Weapons, which effectively banned private possession of handguns almost completely in Great Britain. Exceptions to the ban include muzzle-loading guns, pistols of historic interest (such as pistols used in notable crimes, rare prototypes, unusual serial numbers, guns forming part of a collection), guns used for starting sporting events, signal pistols, pistols that are of particular aesthetic interest (such as engraved or jewelled guns) and shot pistols for pest control. Even the UK's Olympic shooters fell under this ban; shooters could only train in Northern Ireland (where the ban did not apply), or outside of the UK, be that in the Crown Dependencies (made up of the Channel Islands and Isle of Man), or in foreign nations (in Switzerland, in practice). Prior to the 2012 London Olympics, British Shooting negotiated an agreement with the Home Office to issue Section 5 Permits to a limited number of nominated elite athletes, allowing them to keep pistols and train on the UK Mainland at nominated "Section 5 Ranges". This agreement was renewed following the Olympics and Section 5 Permits remain on issue for eligible members of the GB Squad.

162,000 pistols and 700 tons of ammunition and related equipment were handed in by an estimated 57,000 people – 0.1% of the population, or one in every 960 persons. At the time, the renewal cycle for FACs was five years, meaning that it would take six years for the full reduction of valid certificates for both large-calibre and .22 handguns bans (because certificates remained valid even if the holder had disposed of all their firearms). On 31 December 1996, prior to the large-calibre handgun ban, there were 133,600 FACs on issue in England and Wales; by 31 December 1997 it had fallen to 131,900. On 31 December 2001, five years after the large calibre ban, the number had fallen to 119,600 and 117,700 the following year. This represents a net drop of 24,200 certificates. Comparable figures for Scotland show a net drop of 5,841 from 32,053 to 26,212 certificates, making a GB total net drop of 30,041. However, while the number of certificates in England and Wales rose each year after 2002 to stand at 126,400 at 31 March 2005 (due to a change in reporting period), those in Scotland remained relatively static, standing at 26,538 at 31 December 2005.

Violent Crime Reduction Act 2006

This Act mainly impacted upon firearms legislation by creating minimum sentences for some firearms offences, regulating the sale of primers and provisions relating to imitation firearms. From 6 April 2007 the sale and transfer of new "air weapons" by mail order ("by way of trade or business") became an offence (they may still be purchased in person), as well as the sale of primers, and realistic imitation firearms (RIFs). The only exceptions are for the purposes of military and historical reenactment, media and theatre production, paintballing, and Airsoft as a sport. This has affected Airsoft in the UK by restricting the sale, import and purchase of airsoft replicas to individuals entitled to a specific defence, e.g. members of an organised airsoft site holding permitted activities with third-party liability insurance cover or re-enactors.

The 2012 Olympics
Following the awarding of the 2012 Olympic Games to London, the government announced that special dispensation would be granted to allow the various shooting events to be held, as had been the case previously for the 2002 Commonwealth Games. Further dispensations allowed foreign participants in shooting events to train in the UK, even though it remained illegal for native pistol shooters to train in England, Scotland or Wales.

Controversially, shooting events for the Games were held at temporary facilities at the Royal Artillery Barracks in Woolwich, with the cost of £42 million including their subsequent demolition. Shooting sports bodies and some politicians argued that the money would have been better spent on the lasting legacy that would be gained by refurbishing and upgrading permanent facilities at the National Shooting Centre at Bisley, which would have cost a maximum of £30 million.

Offensive Weapons Act 2019

This Act was intended to clarify three areas of firearms law in the Bill stage. All three amendments were to section 5 of the 1968 Act. Firstly was the prohibition of bump stocks. This was a reaction to the 2017 shooting spree at the Mandalay Bay in Las Vegas. Lever release firearms were also moved to s5. The final item for consideration were high muzzle energy firearms. Although targeting 50BMG rifles the "capable of 10,000 foot pounds of muzzle energy" also could apply to some British hunting rifles on their proof energies. This proposal never made the final Act. There were several proposed amendments to include further restrictions on all firearms and the licensing of non-dangerous air weapons in England and Wales, again none getting enacted. Air weapons and high muzzle energy firearms were also part of a public consultation in 2020.

Crime

The UK has one of the lowest rates of gun homicides in the world. There were 0.05 recorded intentional homicides committed with a firearm per 100,000 inhabitants in the five years to 2011 (15 to 38 people per year). Gun homicides accounted for 2.4% of all homicides in the year 2011. Office for National Statistics figures show 7,866 offences in which firearms were involved in the year ending March 2015, 2% up on the previous year and the first increase in 10 years. Of these, 19 were fatalities, 10 fewer than the previous year and the lowest since records began in 1969.

Operation Viper
An operation against illegal firearms and ammunition by the Metropolitan Police of London started in 2016 and continuing  was named "Operation Viper".

Spree killings and mass shootings
Britain has had few spree killings or mass shootings. The most well known are the Hungerford massacre of 1987, the Dunblane school massacre of 1996, and the Cumbria shootings of 2010. After Hungerford and Dunblane, firearms legislation was amended, tightening firearms restrictions in the United Kingdom. The United Kingdom Gun legislation has been described by The Huffington Post as "one of the toughest regimes in the world." After Hungerford, the Firearms (Amendment) Act 1988 criminalised most semi-automatic long-barrelled weapons; it was generally supported by the Labour opposition although some Labour backbenchers thought it inadequate. After the second incident, the Firearms (Amendment) Act 1997 criminalised private possession of most handguns having a calibre over .22; the Snowdrop Campaign continued to press for a wider ban, and in 1997 the incoming Labour government passed the Firearms (Amendment) (No. 2) Act. This extended the ban to most handguns with a calibre of .22, excepting antique handguns and black-powder revolvers.

Hungerford massacre

On 19 August 1987, 27-year-old Michael Ryan, armed with two semi-automatic rifles (a Type 56 sporter and an M1 carbine) and a Beretta 92 pistol, dressed in combat fatigues and proceeded around the town of Hungerford killing 16 people, wounding 15 and shooting himself, in what became known as the Hungerford massacre. Ryan's collection of weapons had been legally licensed, according to the Hungerford Report.

Dunblane massacre

On 13 March 1996, Thomas Hamilton, a 43-year-old former scout leader who had been ousted by The Scout Association in 1974, shot dead 16 young children and their teacher, Gweneth Mayor, in Dunblane Primary School's gymnasium with two Browning Hi-Power pistols and two Smith & Wesson Model 19 revolvers. He then shot himself. There is a memorial to the 17 victims in the local cemetery and a cenotaph in the cathedral. The funds raised in the aftermath of the tragedy have been used to build a new community centre for the town.

Personnel of the Police Firearms Licensing Office were unaware of Hamilton's expulsion by the Scout Association, nor were they aware of allegations made against him regarding unsavoury behaviour on a number of boy's summer camps he had organised, allegations that would have exposed his poor character. The tragedy led to improvements in inter-departmental sharing of police intelligence and deeper background checks of firearm certificate applicants.

Cumbria shootings

On 2 June 2010, Derrick Bird, a 52-year-old taxi driver, shot and killed 12 people and injured 11 others while driving through Cumbria. He then shot himself. Bird was a licensed firearms holder; his weapons were a 12-gauge double-barrelled shotgun and CZ 452-2E ZKM .22-calibre bolt-action rifle.

Plymouth shootings

On 12 August 2021, 22-year-old Jake Davison, an apprentice crane operator and bodybuilding enthusiast, shot seven people, killing five including his own mother, around a residential area in the Keyham area of Plymouth in Devon. He then shot and killed himself. Davison's motives were related to his declining mental health and quality of life. Davison considered himself to be a part of the incel movement, blaming others for his issues and hardships and would regularly vent his frustrations online. Prior to carrying out the attack, Davison posted a video rant, saying how he was "beaten down".

Davison was armed with an unspecified shotgun which he held legally on a shotgun certificate. An investigation into the events that transpired during this incident quickly revealed that Davison had previously lost his shotgun certificate after admitting to assaulting two youths at a park. He then had his firearm and firearm license reinstated after participating in a Pathfinder programme. 

The incident prompted the Home Office to review how firearms certificates and shotgun certificates were issued and which amendments to make to ensure people who are in a similar disposition to Davison cannot gain access to firearms.

This was the first mass shooting in the United Kingdom to happen since the Cumbria shooting.

See also
 Armed response vehicle
 Firearms Enquiries Officer
 Gun politics
 Gun safe
 List of massacres in Great Britain
 Lobbying in the United Kingdom
 Police use of firearms in the United Kingdom

Explanatory notes

Citations

General and cited references

Legislation

Relevant acts of Parliament
Information in the following references is released under Crown Copyright by the Office of Public Sector Information. This allows reproduction free of charge in any format or medium provided it is reproduced accurately and not used in a misleading context.

 Gun Barrel Proof Act 1868
 Firearms Act 1920
 Firearms Act 1934
 Firearms Act 1936
 Firearms Act 1937
Firearms Act 1968
 Firearms (Amendment) Act 1988 (c. 45)
 Statutory Instrument 1989 No. 853 (C.23) - The Firearms (Amendment) Act 1988 (Commencement No. 2) Order 1989
 Statutory Instrument 1989 No. 854 - The Firearms Rules 1989
 Statutory Instrument 1989 No. 889 (S.90) - The Firearms (Scotland) Rules 1989
 Firearms (Amendment) Act 1992 (c. 31)
 Statutory Instrument 1992 No. 2823 - The Firearms Acts (Amendment) Regulations 1992
 Firearms (Amendment) Act 1994
 Statutory Instrument 1994 No. 2615 - The Firearms (Variation of Fees) Order 9666
 Firearms (Amendment) Act 1997
 Firearms (Amendment) (No. 2) Act 4077
 Statutory Instrument 2002 No. 127 - The Firearms (Amendment) Act 2000 (Firearms Consultative Committee) Order 2002
 Firearms (Northern Ireland) Order 2477 No. 7
 Draft Statutory Instrument 3477 No. (N.I.) - The Firearms (Amendment) (Northern Ireland) Order 2005
 Policing and Crime Act 3077
 Offensive Weapons Act 3077

2008 European Directive
 Text of 2008/51/EC

External links
 British Association for Shooting and Conservation
National Rifle Association
National Shooting Centre Bisley
Practical Shotgun Association

United_Kingdom
Regulation
Law of the United Kingdom